Mario Joseph Gabelli (born June 19, 1942) is an American stock investor, investment advisor, and financial analyst.  He is the founder, chairman, and CEO of Gabelli Asset Management Company Investors (Gamco Investors), an investment firm headquartered in Rye, New York. Forbes Magazine listed him as #1712 in December 2022 on the list of Billionaires, with a net worth of $1.7 billion US dollars. On January 10, 2000, Gabelli was inducted into the "Barron's All Century Team," their list of the most influential mutual fund industry portfolio managers. Mr. Gabelli was named an honorary member of Local 6 and the Hotel Trades Council in December 2019 and formally inducted into the Horatio Alger Association of Distinguished Americans on April 2–4, 2020, during the Association's 73rd Horatio Alger Award Induction Ceremonies in Washington, D.C.

Early life and education
Gabelli, the son of Italian immigrants, was born in The Bronx and went to Fordham Preparatory School, where he graduated in 1961. He has said he read market reports for fun when he was very young and that he bought his first stock when he was 13 years old.

Gabelli won a scholarship and graduated from Fordham University summa cum laude in 1965. He received his Master of Business Administration degree from Columbia Business School.  At Columbia, he was taught by Roger Murray, noted value investing professor and co-author of the Fifth Edition of Security Analysis, The Graham & Dodd Value Investing Bible. Gabelli and his firm later launched the Graham & Dodd, Murray, Greenwald Award for Distinguished Value Investors. This award is presented yearly at his Annual Client Symposium.

Investment career

Loeb, Rhoades & Co. 
After graduation, Gabelli accepted a position at Loeb, Rhoades & Co. as a security analyst responsible for coverage of farm equipment, auto parts conglomerates and later media and broadcasting.  Gabelli put into practice the theory of value investing he had learned at Columbia. He rated companies not by earnings but cash flow, analyzing a firm in great detail to calculate what he called private-market value: not the share price at which a stock was selling on an exchange, but the price per share someone would be willing to pay in order to buy the whole company.

Gabelli & Co. 
In 1976, Gabelli formed Gabelli & Co., an institutional brokerage house, with borrowed funds and money he had accumulated trading his own account. Soon after Gabelli formed Gabelli Investors (later Gamco Investors) to manage money for clients.

The Gabelli Mutual Funds 
Gabelli's first investment vehicle for the general public, The Gabelli Asset Fund, launched in March 1986 as a no-load fund requiring a minimum of $25,000 to invest. Later, and today, this fund is available for a minimum investment of $1,000 and accepts IRA investments without a minimum.  The Asset Fund was later followed on by The Gabelli Equity Trust, a closed-end fund, which, at the time, was the largest equity offering on the NYSE.  By the end of 1988, Gabelli's firm had three mutual funds—two run by himself—with combined assets of $650 million. By 1998, Gabelli Asset Management Inc. was managing $16.3 billion. In February 1999, the company went public selling 6 million shares, or about twenty percent of the common stock at $17.50 per share.

Fund Manager of the Year (1997) 
In 1997, when ten Gabelli equity funds averaged a return of 31.7 percent, the best of any U.S. mutual fund group, Gabelli was honored by Morningstar, Inc. as the domestic equity fund manager of the year.

Money Manager of the Year (2010) 
The Institutional Investor selected Mario Gabelli as 2010 Money Manager of the Year for its second annual U.S. Investment Management Awards. The award selection was based on performance as well as a survey by U.S. institutions.

Wealth & Philanthropy
Signators of The Giving Pledge, Gabelli and his wife Regina joined the cause in 2017, which is a commitment by the world's wealthiest individuals and families to dedicate the majority of their wealth to giving back. According to Forbes magazine, Gabelli's net worth was $1.4 billion as of April 2020.

Iona University 
In February 2023, Gabelli generously established an endowed professorship in finance at the LePenta School of Business.  In addition to this gift, he has also made a pledge to advance strategic initiatives on Iona's new campus in Bronxville, home to the New York-Presbyterian Iona School of Health Sciences.

Horatio Alger Award 
In April 2022, Gabelli was inducted into Horatio Alger Association of Distinguished Americans, Inc., and received the Horatio Alger Award.  The Horatio Alger Association of Distinguished Americans, Inc., is a nonprofit educational organization honoring the achievements of outstanding individuals and encouraging youth to pursue their dreams through higher education. For more than 70 years, the Horatio Alger Award has been annually bestowed upon esteemed individuals who have succeeded despite facing adversities, and who have remained committed to higher education and charitable efforts in their communities.

Case Western Reserve University 
In October 2022, Gabelli made a $2 million contribution to Case Western Reserve University to establish the Mario J. Gabelli Distinguished Professorship in Finance.  Case Western celebrated the inaugural chairholder at a campus ceremony on October 12, 2022.

Pace University 
On July 1, 2021, Gabelli through his Foundation, Gabelli Foundation, Inc contributed $1.5 million to establish the Gabelli Endowed Anthony R. Pustorino Distinguished Professorship in Accounting, a restricted endowment at Pace University. The Fund shall be restricted to support, in perpetuity, a named Professor in the Lubin School of Business Accounting Department.

University of Nevada, Reno 
In December 2013, the University of Nevada, Reno announced it had received a $1.5 million donation from the Gabelli Foundation to help pay for the construction of the E. L. Wiegand Fitness Center. Gabelli is a member of the Wiegand Foundation's board of trustees.

Columbia Graduate Business School 
In July 2013, The Gabelli Foundation pledged $15 million. This gift is earmarked for the construction of Columbia Business School's new Manhattanville campus.  The building is scheduled to open in 2018.

Columbus Day Parade 
On October 8, 2012, Gabelli was Grand Marshall of the New York City's 68th Annual Columbus Day Parade - the world's largest celebration of Italian-American culture and heritage.

Fordham University 
Among those recognized at the 2010 Fordham University Founder's Award Dinner were Mario J. Gabelli, CBA '65, and Regina M. Pitaro, FCRH '76, a Fordham trustee and managing director of Gamco Asset Management.  In September 2010, Fordham formally announced Gabelli's $25 million gift, the largest ever in the university's history.  The gift allowed Fordham, which renamed the undergraduate business college the Gabelli School of Business, to expand student scholarships and faculty chairs, and is crucial to the creation of the Center of Global Investment Analysis which brings together students, faculty and professionals in the financial community to enhance scholarship in the study and understanding of capital markets. In 2014, Mario Gabelli funded the University's ability to initiate the Gabelli Ph.D. Program which will establish a doctoral-level business program at Fordham's Gabelli School of Business.  In December 2020, Fordham announced Gabelli, through the Gabelli Foundation, had made the largest gift in the university's history, a $35 million gift to support the business school that bears his name.

Boston College 
In September 2010, Boston College announced Gabelli's $3 million gift that was used to endow a professorship in finance in the college's Carroll School of Management.  An undergraduate dormitory is also named after Gabelli because of a past donation to the school.  Previously, Gabelli, who serves on the college's board of trustees, gave $10 million to create the Gabelli Distinguished Presidential Scholars Fund which provides fifteen students with full tuition every year.
In 2012, Alan Marcus, was named as the first recipient of the Endowed Professorship. 2014, Boston College's Presidential Scholars Program was renamed the Gabelli Presidential Scholars Program as a result of a major gift from the Gabelli Family Foundation. In December 2015, The Gabelli Foundation made a contribution to Boston College to further the Foundation's commitment to the Jesuit philosophy of enhancing the intellectual, spiritual and physical aspects of the whole person.

Roger Williams University - Mario J. Gabelli School of Business 
The Roger Williams University Mario J. Gabelli School of Business was established in 1995, three years after the university conferred an honorary doctor of business degree on Gabelli.  In subsequent years, Gabelli has continued to support the school through additional financial pledges.

University of Miami 
In 2011, a gift from Gabelli enabled the School of Business Administration to establish a new endowed professorship.

NYC Local 6 and the Hotel Trades Council 
At the December 2019 meeting of the Local 6 Delegate Assembly, the union bestowed an honorary membership to Mario Gabelli, whose support for the Hotel Trades Council's scholarship fund has allowed for more awards and larger grants. Mr. Gabelli's father, Joseph Gabelli, was a charter member of both Local 6 and the Hotel Trades Council.

Ellis Island Foundation 
Recipient of the 1996 Ellis Island Medal of Honor for Business Leaders.  The Ellis Island Honors Society awards the medal to celebrate "inspiring Americans who are selflessly working for the betterment of our country and its citizens." The Honors Society describes medal recipients as the "best of America in their celebration of patriotism, diversity and the contributions immigrants continue to make to our nation's economic and social success."

Legal Issues

Mancheski v. Gabelli Group Capital Partners - Investor Lawsuit 
Frederick J. Mancheski, who was Gabelli's first investor in 1976, and David M. Perlmutter, a former attorney for Gabelli brought a lawsuit alleging that Gabelli had prevented them from selling at fair market value their stake in his company. Settlement for $100M: In March 2006, a judge awarded partial summary judgment in favor of claims that he had unfairly prevented Mancheski from selling his shares. In the ensuing settlement, GGCP distributed assets on a pari passu basis including nearly two million shares of NYSE listed Gamco and approximately $20 million in cash.

US Ex Rel. Taylor v. Gabelli - Wireless Spectrum Auction Fraud 
The US Government picked up a complaint filed by Rufus Taylor III that alleges that Gabelli and 38 other entities or individuals that participated in a scheme to use "sham" small-business affiliates to fraudulently buy parts of the U.S. cell-phone spectrum. The alleged scheme operated over the course of eight Federal Communications Commission auctions from 1995 to 2000. In 2001, whistleblower Rufus Taylor III filed a civil lawsuit against several companies owned by Gabelli, alleging fraudulent practices in FCC auctions. The suit had alleged that the Gabelli-backed false "entrepreneurs" included an NBA player, a related party, a former partner of an accounting firm, an aerobics instructor, and even the caretaker of a vacation home in part owned by Gabelli. In those auctions, the government set aside cell phone licenses to be sold to small businesses. Taylor's lawsuit said that Gabelli used more than twelve "sham" startup companies to meet the requirements of a small business applicant in the auctions and acquire the licenses at a small business discount. The whistleblower was an attorney who once worked in the telecommunications business for LICT's competitor Adelphia which went bankrupt. On July 12, 2006, Gabelli and affiliates agreed to pay $130 million to settle the lawsuit. Gabelli's money management business, Gamco Investors, was not a party to the lawsuit.

Personal life
Gabelli lives with his second wife, Regina Pitaro. Gabelli and his first wife, Elaine, the mother of his four children, divorced before 1996.

References

External links
 GAMCO
Gabelli Funds Current Holdings

Further reading
Angenfelt, Magnus (2013). The World's 99 Greatest Investors: The Secret of Success.  Sweden: Roos & Tegner. .

1942 births
Living people
American billionaires
American chief executives of financial services companies
American financial analysts
American hedge fund managers
American investors
American money managers
American stockbrokers
American stock traders
Businesspeople from New York City
CFA charterholders
Fordham Preparatory School alumni
Columbia Business School alumni
Gabelli School of Business alumni
Fordham University alumni
People from the Bronx
Stock and commodity market managers
Giving Pledgers
21st-century philanthropists